Mallam Nuhu Ribadu mni (born 21 November, 1960) is a former Nigerian police officer and politician who was the Chairman of the Petroleum Revenue Task Force and a former Nigerian government anti-corruption official. He was the pioneer Executive Chairman of Nigeria's Economic and Financial Crimes Commission (EFCC), the government commission tasked with countering corruption and fraud. In April 2009, he became a visiting fellow at the Center for Global Development.

He lived in exile until 2010 when he returned to Nigeria and declared his intention to run for President of Nigeria under the platform of the Action Congress of Nigeria (ACN). On Friday, 14 January 2011, Nuhu Ribadu was adopted as the presidential candidate of the ACN.

In August 2014, he defected to the ruling party PDP with the intention to run for the Governorship of Adamawa State, North East Nigeria.

Education
Ribadu studied law at Ahmadu Bello University in Zaria, Kaduna State from 1980 until 1983, receiving a Bachelor of Laws degree.  Following a year at the Nigerian Law School, he was called to Bar in 1984. He also earned a Master of Laws degree from the same university. 
He is a TED Fellow and a Senior Fellow in St. Antony's College, University of Oxford, UK.

Corruption and the EFCC
The Nigerian president, Olusegun Obasanjo, appointed him to the chairmanship of the EFCC in 2003 and reappointed him in 2007, as well as promoting him to the position of Assistant Inspector General of Police.
The promotion on 9 April 2007, three weeks before newly elected President Umaru Yar'Adua was sworn-in, was later challenged on the basis that it was "illegal, unconstitutional, null and void, and of no legal effect."
In December 2007, Mike Okiro, Inspector-General of Police, stated that Ribadu would be removed as EFCC chairman for a one-year training course.

Career in law enforcement
On 20 October 2006, Nuhu Ribadu told the BBC that over 380 billion dollars had been stolen or wasted by Nigerian governments since independence in 1960.
Under Ribadu's administration, the EFCC charged prominent bankers, former State governors, ministers, Senators, high-ranking political party members, commissioners of Police, and advance fee fraud ("419") gang operators.
The EFCC issued thousands of indictments and achieved about 270 convictions. One notable case was that of his boss, the then Inspector-General of the Nigerian Police Force, Mr Tafa Balogun, who was convicted, jailed and made to return £150 million under a plea bargain.

Ribadu's achievements in the EFCC included the de-listing of Nigeria from the FATF List of Non-Cooperative Countries & Territories, admission into the prestigious Egmont Group and the withdrawal of the US Treasury FINCEN Advisory on Nigeria. They helped make the EFCC the foremost Anti-Corruption Enforcement Agency on the continent, cementing Ribadu's reputation in the world as a respected anti-corruption crusader.

Nuhu Ribadu's evidence helped prosecute foreign businesses who offered bribes while doing business in Nigeria.
Ribadu has however been accused of double standard and insincerity in his war against corruption. Many observed that Ribadu went after perceived enemies of his boss, Obasanjo, while shielding the friends of the former president. Notable among his critics is radical Lagos lawyer, Fetus Keyamo who described the withdrawal of charges against Ribadu as totally wrong, very insensitive, entirely unwise and ill-advised. So far, none of the accusations of corruption have been substantiated.  Several newspapers that have led in the criticism of Ribadu are owned by individuals who were facing corruption charges. 

Ribadu regularly inspires youths to become the change they seek. At the fourth edition of "Project Mentor-Me" organised by Group of Patriotic Corpers (GPC), a non-profit group in Abuja, he got the audience to take a critical look at their life choices and how it shapes their future. He was supported by Blossom Nnodim who is particularly known for her Social Media for Social Good messages.

Bribery and persecution
During  the course of his duty Ribadu was offered bribes to pervert the course of justice, amongst these was a State governor who offered Ribadu $15 million and a house abroad. Interviewed from Washington D.C. on the BBC's Hardtalk programme, Ribadu said that he took the money and used the bribe as evidence to prosecute the state governor. This claim has however been refuted by the ex-governor who noted that the fact that Ribadu put the money in the CBN is not a proof that he gave the money. Ribadu escaped two assassination attempts in Nigeria before he left the country for the United Kingdom in early 2009.

In December 2007, Inspector-General of Police Mike Okiro ordered that Ribadu be temporarily removed from the position of EFCC chairman and ordered him to attend the National Institute of Policy and Strategic Studies (NIPSS) in Kuru, Jos, Plateau State for a mandatory one-year course. The decision was criticised by, among others, Nobel Laureate Wole Soyinka, House of Representatives members, and All Nigeria Peoples Party (ANPP) national chairman Edwin Ume-Ezeoke as politically motivated and/or likely to set back the fight against corruption. On 22 December 2008, as widely predicted, he was dismissed from the Nigerian Police force by the Nigerian Police Service Commission (PSC). He left Nigeria and in April assumed a fellowship at the Center for Global Development. He returned to join the ACN as a presidential aspirant in the 2011 general elections.

International awards
On 15 April 2008, Nuhu Ribadu received the World Bank's 2008 Jit Gill Memorial Award for Outstanding Public Service, for having led a courageous anti-corruption drive in Nigeria, as Head of the Economic and Financial Crimes Commission (EFCC).

On 4 August 2008, the Police Service Commission in Nigeria announced the demotion of Mr. Ribadu from Assistant Inspector-General of Police (AIG) to Deputy Commissioner of Police.  Former President Olusegun Obasanjo had promoted Ribadu to AIG weeks before the end of his tenure in office in 2007.

On 22 November 2008, his graduation from the NIPSS Kuru, Plateau State was aborted at the last minute. Mallam Nuhu Ribadu, who was initially seated in the hall along with other graduands, was ordered out of the hall allegedly on orders from top administration officials. There were condemnations from all over the world for his treatment.

On 8 December 2018, he bagged a global lifetime achievement award on anti-corruption campaign. The award was administered by Qatar-based think-tank, Rule of Law and Anti-corruption Centre (ROLACC)
.

References

External links
Economic and Financial Crimes Commission (EFCC) website
Official Nuhu Ribadu for President campaign website
There was a misunderstanding with the Nigerian FG

1960 births
Living people
Nigerian Muslims
Nigerian police officers
Law enforcement in Nigeria
Ahmadu Bello University alumni
Nigerian Law School alumni
Members of the Nigerian National Institute of Policy and Strategic Studies
Candidates in the Nigerian general election, 2011
People from Adamawa State